The Durham–Humphrey Amendment explicitly defined two specific categories for medications, legend (prescription) and over-the-counter (OTC). This amendment was co-sponsored by then Senator (and later Vice President)  Hubert H. Humphrey Jr., who was a pharmacist in South Dakota before beginning his political career.  The other sponsor of this amendment was Carl Durham, a pharmacist representing North Carolina in the House of Representatives.

The bill requires any drug that is habit-forming or potentially harmful to be dispensed under the supervision of a health practitioner as a prescription drug and must carry the statement, "Caution: Federal law prohibits dispensing without a prescription."

Until this law, there was no requirement that any drug be labeled for sale by prescription only. The amendment defined prescription drugs as those unsafe for self-medication and which should therefore be used only under a doctor's supervision.

Legend drugs must be dispensed with direct medical supervision, but over-the-counter drugs can be purchased and used without a prescription.

The law also legalized verbal transmission of prescriptions and provided for the legal right of a pharmacist to refill prescriptions as indicated in a provider's initial prescription.

See also
 Federal Food, Drug, and Cosmetic Act
 Kefauver Harris Amendment
 Food and Drug Administration

References

Pharmaceuticals policy